The 2010–11 LEN Euroleague was the highest-level competition in men's European club water polo. It involved the champions and other top teams from European national leagues and ran from September 2010 to May 2011. The Final Four (semifinals, final, and third place game) took place on 3–4 June at Foro Italico, Rome.

Allocation by federation
Water polo federations are allocated places in accordance with their performances in the preliminary round (group stage) of the 2009–10 LEN Euroleague:
 Seeded Federations ranked 1–8 in a ranking of the best-placed team from each federation in the preliminary round of the previous year's competition have three teams qualify. In 2009/10, the preliminary round had exactly eight federations represented: Croatia, Greece, Italy, Hungary, Montenegro, Russia, Serbia, and Spain
 All other federations have two teams qualify and are unseeded

Federations do not have to enter their top two teams into the Euroleague. If they do not think their clubs can be competitive, they can enter teams into the second-tier LEN Cup.

Format and Distribution
The LEN Euroleague 2010/11 has a slightly different format to previous years with the addition of a second group stage to replace the two-legged quarterfinals. There are five phases to this competition:
 First qualifying round (Round-robin tournament) at a single site the weekend ending 26 September 2010
 Second qualifying round (Round-robin tournament) at a single site the weekend ending 10 October 2010
 Preliminary round (First Group stage) played home and away from 13 November 2010 to 2 February 2011
 Quarterfinal round (Second Group stage) played home and away from 16 February to 4 May 2011
 Final four played as a single knockout tournament on 27–28 May 2011

Teams
League positions of the previous season shown in parentheses.

th Title Holder

Tournament phase

First qualifying round

Group A (Košice)

Group B (Istanbul)

Group C (Szeged)

Group D (Budva)

Second qualifying round

Group E (Barcelona)

Group F (Novi Sad)

Group G (Berlin)

Group G (Rijeka)

Group stage

Group A

Group B

Group C

Group D

Quarterfinal Round (Second Group Stage)

Group A

Group B

Final Four (Rome)
Stadio Olimpico del Nuoto, Rome, Italy

Semi-finals

Third place

Final

Final standings

Awards

Notes

References

External links

 Competition's official website

LEN Champions League seasons
Champions League
2010 in water polo
2011 in water polo